Michael Jay Solomon (born January 20, 1938) is an American businessman, and entertainment executive. Solomon's career spans more than 50 years in the media and content distribution business. He is the founder and president of several publicly and privately held companies which are listed in his Bloomberg profile. Solomon has founded or sits on the board of philanthropic organizations benefiting education, public health, and the arts.

Early life and education
Solomon is the son of Mildred Rickmann & Leroy Solomon. He has a sister named Susan Goldberg, born in 1935.  He was born in New York City, New York, where his family has resided for 4 generations. Mr. Solomon was educated at the Milford Prep School, in Milford, Connecticut, the New York University Stern School of Business, where he served on NYU's Board of Overseers (33 years), and also at Emerson College in Boston, Massachusetts where he was awarded an Honorary Doctor of Law degree in May 1991, and in October 2019 he was appointed to their Board of Advisors.  He is a member of the international honor society Beta Gamma Sigma.

Career

United Artists
Solomon began his career in film distribution with United Artists (UA) in 1956 at the age of 18. When he graduated from New York University at age 21, UA sent him to Panama to open the Central American territory for American films. A year later he was assigned to Bogota, Colombia and when he was 24 he became manager of Peru and Bolivia.

MCA (now NBCUniversal)
After 8 years with United Artists, MCA (now Comcast, Universal, and NBC) hired Solomon to start their Latin American TV division.  He resided in Mexico and Brazil, and put most of the TV stations on the air in Latin America. After several years, he moved back to New York and conducted international business in the Middle East, Europe, Asia, Africa as well as Latin America. He became a vice president at MCA at 30 years old. He spent 14 years at MCA.

Telepictures
In 1978 Solomon co-founded Telepictures Corporation and served as its chairman and CEO. Telepictures grew to become one of the largest U.S. television syndication companies at that time, and one of the largest international distribution companies. Telepictures became a public company (NASDAQ) 14 months after Solomon became CEO in January, 1980. The company created television syndication with the series The People’s Court, which is still on the air after 32 years. Telepictures was the owner and operator of six television stations in the U.S. (one in Puerto Rico), and the publisher of six magazines, including US magazine (now US Weekly), which they bought out of bankruptcy with Jann Wenner, co-founder and publisher of the pop-culture magazine Rolling Stone. He was responsible for introducing American content to third world countries such as China, Russia, and India. He was also the first international distributor of The Grammys, MTV, and E! Entertainment Television (more commonly known as E!).

Lorimar-Telepictures
In 1985 Telepictures merged with Lorimar to form Lorimar-Telepictures Corporation. Solomon became the new company's president and served on its board of directors. During his tenure, Lorimar-Telepictures became the largest television production and distribution company in the U.S., producing major television series such as Dallas, Falcon Crest, Knots Landing, and ALF among others. These series were produced at the Lorimar-Telepictures Studios, (formerly MGM Studios), which is now Sony Pictures Entertainment.

Warner Bros. Television
In 1989, Lorimar-Telepictures was acquired by Warner Bros. Television. Solomon became President of Warner Bros. International Television, where he oversaw sales and marketing operations for television cable and satellite companies outside of the U.S. Warner Bros. expanded international telecommunications interests.  Solomon is a co-founder of HBO OLE (now HBO Latin America). Solomon co-founded the first satellite-delivered station in Scandinavia (SF Succe), and co-owned a TV and feature film production company in India (Armitraj-Solomon) and France. He was the first international distributor of The Grammys, MTV and E! Entertainment Television, (more commonly known as E!).

Solomon International Enterprises
In 1994, following his tenure at Warner Bros., Solomon began his own television communications company, Solomon Entertainment Enterprises.  He distributed independent TV product to the international market and formed a partnership with Canal +, France and UFA, Germany to produce TV movies.

During this time period, Solomon created El Camino Entertainment Group, Inc. (now called North American Midway Entertainment), a company that provides amusement park rides, games and food to approximately 15 million fairgoers every year in 20 states and 4 Canadian provinces.

Solomon also partnered with Shanghai Media Group Broadband(SMGBB) and RayV (an Israeli company) which subsequently was acquired by Yahoo.

Truli Media Group
Truli Media Group Inc. was founded by Solomon in 2010, and he served as chairman and CEO. Truli is a digital aggregator of content focusing on family and faith. The company was acquired by Chicken Soup for the Soul Entertainment in May, 2018.

Digital Content International
Solomon founded Digital Content International (DCI) in June 2017. DCI is a global aggregator of original and licensed video content that is distributed to terrestrial and digital networks over CDN. In October 2017, Solomon formed a working relationship with Espen Huseby, owner, and CEO of Nordic World, an independent producer and distributor of video content in Scandinavia, and the owner of approximately 2000 video titles. DCI acquires and re-licenses video content globally.

Involvy AB 
Solomon is a Founder and Chairman of Involvy AB, which is an advisory firm based in Sweden with founders based in different European countries and in the U.S., and partners with developing companies to nurture growth and support expansion.  Involvy AB contributes with its professional skills and international network, working in projects involving partnerships and investments to push growth and sustainability.

Working Nation 
Solomon is a member of the executive committee of Working Nation. This is a nonprofit media content company focused on the future of work and how corporations, governments, nonprofits, and educational institutions are working to close the jobs skills gap that is threatening to disrupt our economy.

The Genius Institute 
Solomon was recently appointed as a board member of THE GENIUS INSTITUTE.  This technology platform is dedicated to the development of the individual, in attaining professional goals and in creating rewarding relationships.  More importantly, this program has been designed to aid organizations in their interactions with employees so that they can build a sustainable track record in their performance and growth within the company.

Back to Space 
Solomon has joined the Board of Advisors of a new venture, Back to Space. The goal of the company is to inspire and enhance an interest in science, engineering and space, by constructing a high-tech lunar landscape experience facility in Texas.  This facility will have the ability to simulate riding in a rocket, landing on the moon, and experiencing a walk on the moon's surface.

Chicken Soup for the Soul Entertainment Inc. 
In 2021, Michael Jay Solomon became a senior advisor to Chicken Soup for the Soul Entertainment Inc., one of the largest operators of streaming advertising-supported video-on-demand (AVOD) networks. Mr. Solomon assists Chicken Soup for the Soul Entertainment in various business functions, including program library and company acquisitions, co-production financing, as well as sales and other activities, with a focus on assisting the company with respect to its global AVOD rollout.

Additional media interests
Solomon was founder and owner of Prime Time Communications in Spain and Romania, and a co-owner of Iguana Productions in Peru. In May 2016, Solomon was named chairman of the board of VidaPrimo, a Latin entertainment video channel ranking 4th worldwide with 24 million unique visitors in January 2016.

Professional honors and awards
Solomon was presented the Jerusalem Award in 1989, by the Honorable Howard L. Berman, attorney and member of the US House of Representatives. He received this award for work with the Shaare Zedek Medical Center's Pediatric department. The center's charter is to provide medical care to the people of Israel regardless of race, religion, color, age or ability to pay.

Solomon served on the Board of Overseers of New York University Stern School of Business for 33 years, is a special advisor to the President of Emerson College in Boston and is on their Board of Advisors.

He is a Founder of The Sam Spiegel Film and Television School in Jerusalem, and was Founding Chairman of The Jerusalem Foundation of the West Coast of the United States. He is also the Honorary Chairman of the Actors Equity of China, being the first American to ever hold this post. Solomon served on the Entertainment Business & Management Advisory Board at UCLA. He also served on the board of the International Council of the National Academy of Television Arts and  the group that awards International Emmy Awards), and on the board of the USC Annenberg School of Communication & Journalism/London School of Economics Communication Degree Program. Solomon is a Founder of the American Film Market Association (AFM). AFM is a network of acquisition and development executives from more than 70 countries that meet once a year to sell, finance and acquire films. In March 2013 he was nominated to receive the annual Ellis Island Medal of Honor.

Personal life
Solomon was married to Barbara Gottlieb from 1968 to 1976 and they had one son, Lee, born in 1972. In 1979, Solomon married Luciana Paluzzi. Paluzzi is an Italian actress who is best known for playing Fiona Volpe, a SPECTRE operative and the villainess in the 1965 James Bond film Thunderball. The two reside in Beverly Hills, CA, where they have been living for over 35 years. Paluzzi has a son, Christian, from her previous marriage to actor Brett Halsey.

Philanthropic activities
Solomon co-founded and is Chairman of The Careyes Clinic in Jalisco, Mexico. The clinic serves approximately 4000 people in the local community and other surrounding areas. He has been on the Board of The Jeffrey Modell Foundation for the past 30 years.

References

American mass media owners
American technology company founders
American businesspeople in the online media industry
20th-century American Jews
1938 births
American film studio executives
Living people
21st-century American Jews